{{taxobox
|name = Cryptantha nubigena'
|regnum = Plantae
|unranked_divisio = Angiosperms
|unranked_classis = Eudicots
|unranked_ordo = Asterids
|ordo = (unplaced)
|familia = Boraginaceae
|genus = Cryptantha|species = C. nubigena|binomial = Cryptantha nubigena|binomial_authority = (Greene) Payson
|}}Cryptantha nubigena is a perennial plant in the Borage Family (Boraginaceae). It is commonly called Sierra cryptantha.

Habitat and range

Growth pattern
It has short, leafy stems, but less densely leafy than Low Cryptantha Cryptantha humilis.

Leaves and stems
Hairy leaves are spoon shaped.

Inflorescence and fruit. 
Flowers are white and less than wide.
 
The wrinkled ovate fruits (nutlets) are more smooth than C. humilis''.

References

nubigena
Flora of the Sierra Nevada (United States)